Li Jingfei (13 October 1957 – 24 November 2022) was a Chinese actor noted for his role as Zhang Fei in the television series Romance of the Three Kingdoms (1994).

Biography 
Li was born in Shijiazhuang, Hebei, on 13 October 1957.

Li made his screen debut with a supporting role in the 1986 war film Sabotage Operation, which was also his only film. Li gained national fame for his starring role as Zhang Fei in the 1994 television series Romance of the Three Kingdoms, adapted from Luo Guanzhong's masterpiece of the same title. In 2008, he played a supporting role in the drama television series Life is Beautiful, alongside Li Xuejian and Wu Yue. In 2011, he cooperated with Sun Yanjun and Lu Shuming for the third time to play the role of Bo Yahao in the mythical drama Strange Destiny of Fragrant Hills.

Personal life and death 
Li had a daughter named Li Yaoyao.

In his later years, Li suffered from cerebral infarction. On 24 November 2022, he died from an illness in Shijiazhuang, Hebei, at the age of 65.

Filmography

Film

Television

Drama

References 

1957 births
2022 deaths
People from Shijiazhuang
Chinese film actors
Chinese television actors
20th-century Chinese people